Germany's Next Topmodel, Cycle 3 is the third season of the show that was aired on the German television network ProSieben. The show started airing on 28 February 2008 with 120 semi-finalists in the competition, and finished on 5 June 2008.

This cycle's tagline as mentioned in the television previews, is "Sie laufen wieder" ("They walk again" – as in to walk the runway). This season was commercially presented by Volkswagen Tiguan. For this season the number of contestants was expanded to 19. The show was hosted by top model Heidi Klum. Vanessa Hegelmaier, who withdrew due to an accident, became an internationally successful topmodel after the show. The winner of the show was 16-year-old Jennifer Hof from Rodgau.

The international destinations for this cycle were set in Barcelona, Vienna, Tel Aviv, Los Angeles, New York City and Sydney.

Episode summaries

Episode 1: Das große Casting in Köln
Original airdate: 28 February 2008

Out of 18.217 applicants, 120 girls from all over Germany, Austria and Switzerland came to Cologne to convince the judges of their qualities as Germany's next top model. The young women had to walk the runway either in a favourite outfit or bathing suit. Moreover, they undertook small challenges: Some had to sing, dance or scream in wrath, others were told to advertise a shampoo or even expose the preferences of a cleansing agent for toilets. Meanwhile, the other contestants had to show three different emotions (anger, pain, and happiness) in a one-minute photo shoot.

The judges narrowed down the competition to fifty girls, who flew to Barcelona in a surprise trip the next morning. They were booked for the BREAD & BUTTER – tradeshow for selected brands festival on 16 January 17 January, and 18 January 2008. The show was presented by Phillipp Plein, a well-known designer, on the same evening. As most of the girls had not been very experienced in doing a runway show, some of them had severe problems on the catwalk which lead to several pitiable sights. In the end thirty girls reached the next round.

Featured photographer: Robertino Nicolic
Special guests: Boris Entrup & Philipp Plein

Episode 2: Die Sedcard
Original airdate: 6 March 2008

Featured photographers: Stephan Pick, Oliver Schulze
Special guest: Petra Gessulat
Guest judge: Petra Gessulat

Episode 3: Erster Zoff im Modelhaus
Original airdate: 13 March 2008

The 19 finalists are taken to their first destination in Austria to do a photo shoot in front of a helicopter. However, before that judge Rolf Scheider reports about several complaints by the hotel organisation about how the girls left their rooms and asks the abusers to reveal themselves in front of the entire group. Gisele, Sarah and Gina-Lisa admit to having smoked in the rooms but who has drunk all the alcohol from the mini-bar remains a secret. Scheider promises consequences for everyone.

At the photo shoot several girls have trouble with the wind like Gina-Lisa whose dress is constantly soaring up leaving her underwear visible for several moments but its Gisele who's taken most of the attention due to being afraid of helicopters. Back in Germany the girls finally arrive at the model house but as a result of none of them admitting having drunk the alcohol yet, they are taken back to a youth hostel as a punishment for the entire group. One day later they are finally allowed to stay in the luxurious building but it's the first house meeting, organized by Gisele, Katharina and Aisha, that is causing new trouble. Several girls accuse each other of being responsible for a bad atmosphere, and Gisele accuses Aline of having called Gina-Lisa a prostitute. The meeting ends without any constructive result when Gisele bursts out into tears because the group surrounding Aline is calling her a liar.

On elimination day the girls have to do a runway walk in front of the judges while keeping an egg on a spoon in their mouth. While hearing her criticism, Katharina is asked by the judges who was bitching the most in the house, and as she states its Tainá both girls are happy to have a chat in front of the panel which is interrupted by Heidi after seeing no signs of results coming up from that. Outside the room Katharina is accused by the other girls for being a snitch and another argument between the two parties begins. The episode ends with a cliffhanger once again, the first time being cycle 2's episode 11. The elimination process is completely cut from the episode but a preview showed a few seconds of the following week's episode.

Booked for job: Vanessa Hegelmaier
Featured photographer: Kristian Schuller
Guest judge: Kristian Schuller

Episode 4: Haare ab
Original airdate: 20 March 2008

Last week's elimination is shown at the very beginning of this episode. Rubina is eliminated due to the inability to express her personality in a photo shoot. Heidi Klum tells Aisha that she has a lot of potential but the judges don't think they are able to bring out the best in her, so she is sent home as well. The judges panel also decides to send Sandra home because her under achievements hamper the progress of the show.

The remaining contestants go to a salon for their makeovers. Gina-Lisa and Wanda, however, complain throughout the entire process. Lohfink is upset in large part because she does not want to have her long white weave cut short. Badwal cries about her hair loss.

Afterwards the contestants are taken to a fashion store where they have to pick outfits that match their new haircut. Once again Lohfink draws everybody's attention by wrapping herself up in ten articles of clothing. – She is certain that she is allowed to keep everything she wears. Gisele and Sarah are chosen as the challenge's winners. They get to choose a complete outfit for free.

The girls then visit the tanzhaus nrw where personal coach Dr. Stefan Fredrich encourages them to talk about themselves in front of the group. Oppermann reveals being bullied in the past by her schoolmates and breaks down once again in front of the group just like some other girls.

Eight contestants are given the chance to audition for the leading role in a C&A shoes television commercial; Janina wins the modelling job.

For the week's photo shoot, the girls have to pose in pairs. Each girl is representing the opposite to her partner. Carolin and Jennifer are safe from elimination and get a business class ticket for the plane that will move the contestants to their new home in New York City.

At judging, Aline is called out for not satisfying the judges' expectation concerning her photo, while Tainá Silva is criticized for her lack of potential. Both girls are eliminated.

Eliminated: Sandra Korte, Rubina Radwanski & Aisha Grone
Challenge winner: Gisele Oppermann & Sarah Knappik
Booked for job: Janina Schmidt
Eliminated: Tainá Silva & Aline Tausch
Featured photographer: Matt McCabe
Special guests: Helena Faccenda, Dr. Stefan Fredrich, Evelyn Hammerström, Berthold Steinle & Thomas Krygier
Guest judge: Helena Faccenda

Episode 5: Willkommen in New York
Original airdate: 27 March 2008

The remaining 14 contestants start their journey in New York with attending different castings for the currently running New York Fashion Week. Janina finds herself in the lucky position of landing two jobs on different shows and Jennifer wins a job for a promotional in front of New York's skyline. Once again the girls get in trouble after being forced by the judges to vote for the four weakest among them that should not attend castings. Sarah is named by everyone including herself for still not being able to walk followed by Gina-Lisa, Carolin and Christina. Although not being among these four, Gisele gets teary for another time after receiving a heavy number of votes as well. At a casting for Miss 60 Vanessa, Janina, Bianca and Gisele reach the second round. Janina, who wins the casting is allowed to choose two girls of the other three to watch the show, what makes her choose Vanessa and Bianca. At the week's photo shoot at which the girls have to pose with exotic animals, Oppermann refuses to take photos with an ape after not being happy with how the animal is being treated by the team. Therefore, Heidi tells her on eliminations day that they are sick of her behavior and gives her a warning but lets her pass onto the next round. It is Elena, the only Austrian among the finalists, who has to leave New York halfway with being criticized for having started on a very high level but not being able to build upon this and being surpassed by the other girls.

This week's photo shoot was inspired by the shoot for 1-800-Flowers on the episode The Girl Who Suddenly Collapsed from America's Next Top Model, Cycle 4.

Challenge winner: Wanda Badwal & Christina Leibold
Eliminated: Elena Rotter
Featured Photographer: Oliver Gast
Booked for job: Jennifer Hof & Janina Schmidt 
Special guests: Kristian Schuller, Hana Soukupová, Gunter Thiel, Mario Page & Wichy Hassan
Guest judge: Oliver Gast

Episode 6: Ganz verliebt am Strand
Original airdate: 3 April 2008

This week's photo shoot was inspired by the beach shoot on the episode The Girl Who Blames The Taxi Driver from America's Next Top Model, Cycle 8.

Challenge winner: Raquel Alvarez, Sophia Maus & Vanessa Hegelmaier
Booked for job: Gisele Oppermann, Raquel Alvarez, Sophia Maus & Vanessa Hegelmaier
Eliminated: Katharina Harms
Featured photographer: Russell James
Special guests: Heike Jarick, Marco Glaviano & Petra Gessulat
Guest judges: Alek Wek

Episode 7: Keine Zeit für Jetlag!
Original airdate: 10 April 2008

This week's photo shoot was inspired by the gender swap shoot on the episode The Girl Who Takes Credit from America's Next Top Model, Cycle 8.

First eliminated: Gina-Lisa Lohfink
Booked for job: Christina Leibold, Janina Schmidt, Jennifer Hof, Vanessa Hegelmaier, Jennifer Hof & Wanda Badwal
Second eliminated: Bianca Schumacher
Special guest: Yfke Sturm
Guest judge: Yfke Sturm

Episode 8: Vertical Catwalk
Original airdate: 17 April 2008

This week's photo shoot was inspired by the nude shoot on the episode The Girl Who Marks Her Territory from America's Next Top Model, Cycle 7.

Challenge winner: Vanessa Hegelmaier & Wanda Badwal
Booked for job: Sophia Maus, Jennifer Hof, Janina Schmidt, Carolin Ruppert, Gisele Oppermann & Wanda Badwal
Eliminated: Sophia Maus
Featured Photographer: Philippe Kerlo
Special guests: Jochen Schweizer, Boris Entrup, Rankin, Bert Peulecke & Veronika Ziegaus
Guest judge: Philippe Kerlo

Episode 9: Ab nach Down Under
Original airdate: 24 April 2008

This episode marks the first time that host Heidi Klum is not part of the judges panel.

Challenge winner: Raquel Alvarez
Booked for job: Carolin Ruppert, Wanda Badwal, Janina Schmidt, Jennifer Hof, Gisele Oppermann & Christina Leibold
Eliminated: None

Episode 10: Tanz mit den Aborigines
Original airdate: 1 May 2008

Sarah refers to a Bild article published on 11 April 2008 – 33 days before the broadcast.

This week's reward photo shoot was shot on top of the Sydney Harbour Bridge as in The Girl Who Blames The Taxi Driver from America's Next Top Model, Cycle 8.

Quit: Vanessa Hegelmaier
Booked for job: Raquel Alvarez, Sarah Knappik, Christina Leibold & Carolin Ruppert
Eliminated: Sarah Knappik
Guest judge: Erika Eleniak

Episode 11: Actiontraining, Diebestour und Tanzschritte
Original airdate: 8 May 2008

This week the contestants are put to the test when they have to maneuver their way through a laser maze. Carolin wins the challenge, and her reward is jewellery amounting to $10,000. This challenge is taken from the episode The Girl Who Changes Her Attitude on Cycle 8 of America's Next Top Model.
The episode features martial arts training with Daniel Bernhardt and a photo shoot for McDonald's Germany.
In lieu of the main photo shoot that week, the girls act in a Kill Bill themed commercial shoot for a fictional energy drink called taka. The commercial is inspired by the Rollitos chips commercial in the episode The Girl Whose Lip Puffed Up from America's Next Top Model, Cycle 2. Raquel and Jennifer struggle with their commercials and eventually Alvarez is eliminated due to the lack of potential compared to the other contestants. The song that is played during Alvarez's Best of compilation is "Grissom's Overture" by John M. Keane.

Booked for job: Carolin Ruppert,  Christina Leibold & Wanda Badwal
Eliminated: Raquel Alvarez
Featured Director: Thomas Job
Guest judge: Daniel Bernhardt

Episode 12: Showgirls, Küsse und Dita von Teese
Original airdate: 15 May 2008

This week, inspired by her appearance on The Girl Who Graduates from America's Next Top Model, Cycle 7, Dita von Teese helps the contestants to get into the mood for pin-up photography and posing, followed by a Rio Carnival themed photo shoot at the Orpheoum Theatre. It was partly inspired by the pin-up shoot on The Girls Who Are 1940s Pin-ups from America's Next Top Model, Cycle 5. Christina wins the job for a television commercial shoot for the women razor Gillette Venus Breeze filmed by director Ben Hartenstein. Jennifer has a minor accident in the girls' house, injuring her foot.

Eliminated: Gisele Oppermann
Featured Photographer: Salem
Featured Director: Ben Hartenstein
Special guests: Dita von Teese & Mike S. Dutz
Guest judge: Dita von Teese

Episode 13: Ed Hardy, Fitness und ein schmackhaftes Shooting
Original airdate: 22 May 2008

The girls are taken out jogging in the Hollywood Hills with judge Peyman Amin. Later they do a food-themed photo shoot with photographer Kristian Schuller.

Eliminated: None
Featured Photographer: Kristian Schuller
Special guest: Christian Audigier
Guest judge: Kristian Schuller

Episode 14: Cosmopolitan-Shooting, Angriff auf Peyman und die Final-Entscheidung
Original airdate: 29 May 2008

The girls have a busy last week in Los Angeles. The Ed Hardy casting finally results in a shoot with Christina shot by Christian Audigier. A German telco provider does a commercial shoot including an audition where Carolin is selected as the winner. A challenge in the mansion involves humiliating Peyman, just like in the episode Das große Cosmopolitan-Shooting steht bevor from Germany's Next Topmodel, Cycle 2.

At judging, Wanda gets eliminated due to a lack of potential. Christina and Jennifer enter the finale. When Janina and Carolin step forward to the judges, the episode ends with a cliffhanger once again, for the third time in season three.

Eliminated: Wanda Badwal
Featured Director: Matthias Kopp
Special guest: Christian Audigier
Guest judge: Petra Gessulat

Episode 15: Semi-Final
Original airdate: 3 June 2008

For the first time in Germany's Next Topmodel history two episodes are broadcast within one week. This episode features the search for a male top model.

Eliminated: Carolin Ruppert
Guest judge: Petra Gessulat

Episode 16: Das Finale
Original airdate: 5 June 2008

The final show featured all of this cycle's contestants walking the runway. As in previous finale shows, a fake photo shooting is arranged, this time involving a spider and a python. Christina is eliminated first for being too sweet, what leaves Jennifer, who has the most potential, regarding to face and body, as well as Janina, who is the cycle's catwalk-queen. Monrose present their new single "Strike the Match" and Seal performs two of his songs. In the end Jennifer is declared the winner.

Final three: Christina Leibold, Janina Schmidt & Jennifer Hof
Eliminated: Christina Leibold
Final two: Janina Schmidt & Jennifer Hof
Germany's Next Topmodel: Jennifer Hof
Featured photographer: Philippe Kerlo

Contestants
(ages stated are at start of contest)

Summaries

Results table

 The contestant was eliminated
 The contestant was immune from elimination
 The contestant was in danger of elimination
 The contestant withdrew from the competition
 The contestant won the competition

Photo shoot guide
 Episode 1 photo shoot: Emotions
 Episode 2 photo shoot: Sedcard
 Episode 3 photo shoot: Cobra
 Episode 4 photo shoot: Angels and demons
 Episode 5 photo shoot: Animal
 Episode 6 photo shoot: Beach love
 Episode 7 photo shoot: Drag queens
 Episode 8 photo shoot: Hair and nude
 Episode 9 photo shoot: Surf
 Episode 10 photo shoot: Baywatch
 Episode 11 photo shoot: Martial arts commercial 
 Episode 12 photo shoot: Showgirls
 Episode 13 photo shoot: Five course meal
 Episode 14 photo shoot: Cosmopolitan covers

Controversy
 Aline Tausch, who was eliminated in episode four, did a nude photo shoot for penthouse magazine. She was confronted with it by Heidi Klum during the show.
 Gisele Oppermann became known for her whiny voice and her bursting into tears permanently when being confronted with one of her many phobias such as her fear of cockroaches, butterflies ("lepidopterophobia") and elevators. She is the first contestant in the history of Germany's Next Topmodel to quit a photo shoot. (See Willkommen in New York.)
 On 15 May it was reported that Gisele Oppermann used to be a drug dealer in secondary school selling hashish to seventh graders, consuming drugs herself and eventually getting the boot. This happened to be the day of the broadcast of her elimination.
 On 12 April, a "secret list" was published on a fan forum which foresaw all the eliminations correctly. On 22 and 23 May tabloid newspaper Bild published two articles referencing to the list.

In February 2023, the Berliner Zeitung published an article about the show with the headline: "Why isn't Germany’s Next Topmodel actually canceled?" 

In March 2023 former judge Peyman Armin apologized to Lijana Kaggwa for what she had to experience on Germany's Next Topmodel. He also apologized for being part of Germany's Next Topmodel and promised to never take part in the show again. All of this was broadcast in the format "13 questions" on ZDF.

References

External links 
 

Germany's Next Topmodel
2008 German television seasons
Television shows filmed in Germany
Television shows filmed in Spain
Television shows filmed in Austria
Television shows filmed in Israel
Television shows filmed in France
Television shows filmed in Los Angeles
Television shows filmed in New York City
Television shows filmed in Australia